Jana Hani Ismail Mahmoud (born 17 August 2004) is an Egyptian artistic gymnast.  She was a member of the team who won gold at the 2022 African Championships.  Additionally she represented Egypt at the inaugural Junior World Championships.

Personal life 
Mahmoud was born in Giza in 2004.

Gymnastics career

Junior

2018–19
Mahmoud competed at the Stella Zakharova Cup where she finished eighth in the all-around but finished second on balance beam and third on floor exercise.  Mahmoud next competed at the African Championships where she helped Egypt place first as a team.  Individually she placed first in the all-around and second on uneven bars and balance beam.

Mahmoud was selected to compete at the inaugural Junior World Championships alongside Jana Aboelhasan and Salma Melige; they finished 24th as a team and Mahmoud finished 51st in the all-around.  Mahmoud next competed at the Mediterranean Championships where she finished fourth in the all-around and first on floor exercise.  She finished the year competing at the Voronin Cup where she placed second in the all-around and on floor exercise.

Senior

2021
Mahmoud turned senior in 2020 but did not compete until 2021 due to the global COVID-19 pandemic.  She made her senior debut at the African Championships where she recorded the third highest all-around score but did not place due to teammates Zeina Ibrahim and Farah Hussein scoring higher.  She next competed at the Doha World Cup where she placed seventh and sixth on uneven bars and floor exercise respectively.

2022
Mahmoud was selected to compete at the 2022 Mediterranean Games.  She helped Egypt place sixth as a team and individually she placed sixth in the all-around.  She next competed at the African Championships where she helped Egypt place first as a team and qualify to the upcoming World Championships.  Individually she placed first on vault and floor exercise.

Competitive history

References

External links
 

2004 births
Living people
Egyptian female artistic gymnasts
Sportspeople from Giza
Gymnasts at the 2022 Mediterranean Games
21st-century Egyptian women